Loreto House was established in 1842 in Kolkata, by the Sisters of Loreto belonging to the institute of the Blessed Virgin Mary. It is the oldest and the first Loreto institution to be established in India and was one of the few all-girls Catholic schools of that time. 

The School started with sixty students who were taught at a house where nuns lived under Mother Delphine Hart, assisted by Sr. Teresa Mons and Sr. Martina McCann.

The School was initially established for the education of Catholic girls. However, it has long admitted students of many religious beliefs. Currently it is headed by Sister Phyllis. The school is known for hosting annual events like 'We Care' and their popular bi-annual 'Big Fete'.

Notable alumni
Jayashree Mohta – Chairperson of the Sarala Birla Group 
Shobhana Bhartia –Chairperson, Editorial Director  Hindustan Times(HT) Media Group
Abha Narain Lambah – Conservation architect
Riddhima Ghosh – Bengali Actress                        
Raima Sen – Bengali Actress
 Justice  Indira Banerjee - Judge, Supreme Court of India

See also
 Loreto College, Kolkata

References

External links
 

Sisters of Loreto schools
Catholic schools in India
Primary schools in West Bengal
High schools and secondary schools in West Bengal
Christian schools in West Bengal
Girls' schools in Kolkata
Educational institutions established in 1842
1842 establishments in British India